Bede Gaming is a gambling platform and software company based in Newcastle upon Tyne, England, with offices in London, England and Sofia, Bulgaria. It supplies gambling platforms and software to online casinos, online bingo operators, and lotteries in regulated markets. The platform handles more than £3 billion of wagers per year.

Products
Bede Gaming's platform develops modular, device agnostic gambling products, allowing users to bet using a single sign on centralised account. The platform integrates into land-based reporting and loyalty systems, allowing gambling operators to have a single view of their customer both online and in their retail channels. More than 60% of transactions on the platform are conducted on mobile devices such as smartphones and tablet computers. Operators have a suite of management and reporting tools to allow them to track customer behaviour and reward customers with game specific bonuses or promotions. Bede Gaming's platform operates using a single source of code, meaning that there is only one iteration of the platform rather than multiple versions offered by rival gambling platform companies.

Platform integrations
Bede Gaming's platform has integrated games content from land-based and online gambling content providers, including International Game Technology, Bally Technologies, Williams Interactive, Novomatic, Evolution Live Gaming, Realistic Gaming, NetEnt, Playtech, Microgaming Quickfire, Eyecon, Blueprint Gaming, iSoftBet, The Games Company and Endemol Games.

Backend integrations to facilitate client management include WorldPay, Safecharge, Experian, Pentaho, Income Access, SmartFocus's Emailvision, Hasoffers, Neteller, and Jumio.

Clients
Twenty seven online casino and bingo websites use Bede Gaming's platform as the underlying technology for their business. Brands using Bede Gaming's platform include Health Bingo, Euro-millions, Bingo Stars, Svenska Casino, Svenska Bingo and Bingo etc. In January 2015 it was announced that The Rank Group would be using Bede Gaming's platform for their land-based and digital business, Grosvenor Casinos and Mecca Bingo and in February 2016 both sites migrated to the Bede Gaming platform. In September 2018, the company was selected to partner with the Ontario Lottery and Gaming Corporation to provide a new digital platform for the Ontario Lottery.

History
Bede Gaming Ltd was founded in 2011 by Joseph Saumarez Smith, Dan Smyth and Michael Brady, online gambling industry veterans who had previously worked with leading games suppliers such as OpenBet, Playtech and Dragonfish. Their frustration at working with legacy gambling platforms that did not allow simple changes to the customer facing front end led them to develop their own platform.

In May 2017, Bede Gaming joined a limited number of providers in the gambling industry to receive ISO 27001 certification from the International Organization for Standardization deeming its omnichannel platform compliant with current information security standards.

Gauselmann Group acquired a majority stake in Bede Gaming in March 2020  for an undisclosed sum.

Licensing
Bede Gaming is licensed by the UK Gambling Commission and the Alderney Gambling Control Commission as a software supplier.

Awards and recognition
Bede Gaming was named online bingo supplier of the year 2014 at the eGamingReview B2B awards and shortlisted for Platform of the Year and Bingo supplier of the Year in the 2016 EGaming Review B2B Awards Bede clients were shortlisted for Rising Star of the Year and Bingo Operator of the Year in the 2014 eGaming Review Operator Awards and won the Innovation in Bingo award in the 2014 eGaming Operator Marketing Awards.

Bede Gaming won the 'Cushty Company to Work For' award in the 2014 Creative North Awards and the High Growth Company award at the 2014 Dynamo IT and Technology Company awards.

In September 2017, Bede Gaming was named the 76th fastest growing UK private technology company in The Sunday Times Tech Track 100 league table.

External links
Official site

References

Software companies of the United Kingdom
Online gambling companies of the United Kingdom
Companies based in Newcastle upon Tyne